The Box Tree is a restaurant located in Ilkley, West Yorkshire, England. It is owned by Yorkshire businessman Adam Frontal, who is operating the restaurant in the same capacity as previous owners, with an emphasis of remaining very current within the fine dining offering and experience. Current Executive Chef, Kieran Smith, has been leading the kitchen since 2020, growing its ever strong reputation and now currently offers a new tasting menu on a monthly basis. The Box Tree was previously operated by chef Simon Gueller and his wife, Rena, from 2005 to late 2022. Under their management the restaurant has been redecorated, although elements from the original owners of the restaurant remain. Reception by food critics has improved over the years; the restaurant held a single Michelin star until 2019 and three AA rosettes. A sister company is also run by the chef, called Box Tree Events.

The restaurant opened originally as a tearoom in 1962, and went on to become one of the first four British restaurants to win two stars in 1977, under head chef Michael Lawson. After losing both stars, it regained a star between 1996 and 2001, whilst owned by Helen Avis. In 2010, former employee Marco Pierre White bought into the restaurant. It serves modern French cuisine, and has also been awarded three AA rosettes and listed in Harden's restaurant guide.

Description
The Box Tree has been located at 35–37 Church Street in Ilkley since its original opening under Malcolm Reid and Colin Long in 1962. It has been operated by Simon and Rena Gueller since 2004, originally under lease from the previous operator. Gueller had previously been head chef at the Michelin-starred restaurant Rascasse. The Guellers also run a sister company called Box Tree Events, which provides outside catering.

After being purchased by the Guellers in 2004, the restaurant was redecorated and modernised, the décor having become shabby under previous owners. The new decorations included recessed lighting and fabric-covered walls. There is a fireplace in the centre of the dining room, with an 18th-century settle (a type of bench) beside it. Elements from the Reid and Long era remain, with the bar and ceilings still being recognisable from their time at the restaurant.

Menu
The current menu still has elements from the earlier days of the restaurant, such as lobster thermidor and grouse. Chef Gueller produces modern French cuisine, with classical elements. Dishes on the restaurant's menu include a terrine of foie gras served with a salad of smoked eel, alongside apple served both as a jelly and as a purée. Foie gras was temporarily taken off the menu in 2008 following threats of protests from animal rights activists. The dish was later restored to the menu, and foie gras has also since been served with a duck terrine and pistachios.

To celebrate the 45th anniversary of the restaurant in 2008, Gueller recreated elements of the 1963 menu, but decided not to make certain dishes such as chicken chasseur or melon boats. Other parts of the original menu included crêpes and half a grilled grapefruit. The dishes selected were included for a week in a six course 1960s set menu.

History
The sandstone building itself dates back to the 1720s. It was purchased by Reid and Long in 1962 who initially operated the premises as a tea room. The restaurant gained two Michelin stars in 1977; that year's list was the first with two star restaurants in the UK (the others were The Waterside Inn, Le Gavroche and The Connaught).

Following the Michelin stars, the restaurant became a hot-spot for celebrities, with the singer Johnny Mathis being a regular, and both Shirley Bassey and Margaret Thatcher were seen at the restaurant. In 1979 future multi-Michelin star chef Marco Pierre White began working at the Box Tree at the age of 17, under Reid and Long; he received his training at the restaurant. He later recalled in his book White Heat that the restaurant made him obsessed with food and he still considers the restaurant to be his spiritual home.

After holding the two Michelin stars until 1988, and then losing its single star in 1991, in 1992 the restaurant went into receivership and was purchased by Helen Avis. Under chef Thierry LePratre-Granet, the restaurant was restored to a single Michelin star in 1996. White returned to the restaurant as a consultant in 1994, which lasted two months and ended in a court case against the chef with damages of £880 awarded after he damaged a ceiling.

LePratre-Granet left the restaurant in 2001, and was replaced by Toby Hill, the youngest chef ever to hold a Michelin star. The change of chef also changed the style of food served to a "Mediterranean slant". something which did not last as Hill left after only seven months in charge of the kitchen. He was replaced by Shane Goodway in 2002 and the style reverted to traditional French. The restaurant lost the Michelin star in the 2003 edition of the guide and was no longer included in either the AA Restaurant Guide or the Good Food Guide. Goodway left the kitchen shortly after the restaurant lost the Michelin star, but stated that the decision had been taken before they had been informed.

The Guellers leased the restaurant from Avis in 2004. Within five months of re-opening it regained a Michelin star. Having been friends with Simon Gueller since they were teenagers, Marco Pierre White returned to the restaurant in 2007 in order to film segments for the ITV1 cookery reality television show Hell's Kitchen. White has aspirations to work with Gueller to return the Box Tree to its former status as a two-Michelin-starred restaurant.

Reception
Jan Moir reviewed the restaurant in 2004 for The Daily Telegraph shortly after Gueller took over and refurbished the restaurant. She praised the lighter style of the food under the new chef and, although she was initially concerned over the waiter suggesting squab pigeon, she described the dish as "neatly executed", and the most successful dish that she tasted. She thought that the chef was good, but needed time to settle in and described his wife Rina in front of house as a "complete natural". Jay Rayner visited the restaurant in 2005, prior to the restaurant being awarded a new Michelin star. He pointed out some issues regarding menu pricing as there were differences in prices on the website as opposed to in person. He thought that the scallops were undercooked, and the brioche served with a beef tenderloin arrived soggy. He said that the dishes "showed an understanding of the fundamentals", but were not of particular note.

In 2012, Jill Turton ate at the restaurant for the Yorkshire Post following the restaurant's fiftieth anniversary, and described some dishes, such as asparagus and a soft-boiled egg which had been cooked in a bain-marie, as "perfect". She described the meal overall as "terrific", but said that the desserts were not a stretch for the kitchen, having ordered a chocolate brownie.

Harden's, a British restaurant guide, describes the food as "light and delicious", and the cooking as "exemplary". In its review system, it rates the food as one out of five (one being the highest rating available), and both service and ambiance as two out of five. The Automobile Association has awarded The Box Tree three AA rosettes.

References

External links

 Official website

Restaurants in Yorkshire
Michelin Guide starred restaurants in the United Kingdom
Ilkley
1962 establishments in England
Restaurants established in 1962